Tama Tech was an amusement park that operated in Hino, Tokyo, Japan from 1961 to 2009. It closed permanently on September 30, 2009.

History
The park opened in 1961 and was owned by the Honda Motor Company. The park attractions involved motorsports. The park featured a variety of mechanized vehicles which visitors could try out.

In addition to Honda vehicles and electric vehicles, park visitors also could ride a roller coaster and a Ferris wheel. In the winter months park goers could also ice skate.
 
Occasionally Honda introduced a product at the park which made it to mass production. In the case of the Honda Z100 minibike, Honda began to mass produce the bike after seeing its success at the park. The descendant of the minibike was the Honda CZ100, and it was introduced to the European market in 1964.

See also 
Suzuka Circuit
Twin Ring Motegi

References

External links 
Mobilityland website via Archive.org

1961 establishments in Japan
2009 disestablishments in Japan
Buildings and structures in Tokyo
Defunct amusement parks in Japan
Hino, Tokyo
Amusement parks opened in 1961
Amusement parks closed in 2009